The Romulus Central School District is a public school district in New York State that serves approximately 600 students in  in the towns of Romulus, Fayette, MacDougal, East Varick and West Varick in Seneca County with a staff of 100 and a budget of $8 million ($13171 per student).

The average class size is 17 students (elementary), 23 students (secondary). The student-teacher ratio is 11:1.

The district motto is "the small school with a BIG idea".

Martin Rotz is the superintendent of schools.

History
In 1937, a public vote formed Romulus Central School, consolidating more than 12 one-room schoolhouses.

Board of education
The Board of Education (BOE) consists of 7 members, who serve rotating 3-year terms, and a district clerk. Elections are held each May for board members and to vote on the School District Budget.

Current board members (January 2012) are:
Robert McCann - President
Seth Brandow - Vice President
Rachelle Fletcher
Rebecca Jessop
Kara Mapstone
Timothy Wiant
Jennifer Yuhas
Suzanne M. Nicholson - District Clerk

Schools
The district operates one school building, combining a PreK-6 elementary school with a 7-12 secondary school in Romulus, New York. The principal is Christopher Puylara.

Elementary schools
Romulus Central School (PreK-6)

Secondary schools
Romulus Central School (7-12)

Performance
The district's 95% graduation rate exceeds the State Standard of 55%.

References

External links
 
 New York State School Boards Association

School districts in New York (state)
Education in Seneca County, New York
1937 establishments in New York (state)
School districts established in 1937